François-Josué de La Corne Dubreuil, (7 October 1710 — 17 October 1753) was an officer in the colonial regular troops of New France and, as was the norm of the day, involved in family commercial enterprises . He was the son of Jean-Louis de la Corne de Chaptes and a brother of Louis de la Corne, Chevalier de la Corne and Luc de la Corne. His first posting as a commandant of a post was at Fort Kaministiquia, beginning in 1741, where he also engaged in the fur trade.

Biography 

His career took him to  Ohio country, where in June 1753 he became seriously ill while surveying the portage at Fort Le Boeuf. His illness forced him to return to Quebec where he died. François-Josué was a recipient of the cross of Saint Louis.

He was survived by his only child, François-Michel, who probably drowned with his uncle Louis de La Corne in the sinking of the ship Auguste in November 1761.

Sources and references 
 Notes

Citations

References
 
 

1710 births
1759 deaths
People of New France
Canadian fur traders